The 1920 United States presidential election in New Hampshire took place on November 2, 1920, as part of the 1920 United States presidential election which was held throughout all contemporary 48 states. Voters chose four representatives, or electors to the Electoral College, who voted for president and vice president. 

New Hampshire voted for Republican nominee, Senator Warren G. Harding of Ohio, over the Democratic nominee, Governor James M. Cox of Ohio. Harding ran with Governor Calvin Coolidge of Massachusetts, while Cox ran with Assistant Secretary of the Navy Franklin D. Roosevelt of New York. 

Harding won New Hampshire by a margin of 20.45%. His victory in the New England states was helped by the local popularity of his running mate, Calvin Coolidge, a traditional New England Yankee born in the small-town of Plymouth Notch in neighboring Vermont, who had started his political career in neighboring Massachusetts as its governor. Despite this, New Hampshire would be Cox's second-strongest antebellum free state (after Indiana) by popular vote percentage and third-strongest (after Indiana and Cox's Ohio) in terms of percentage margin. Overall the Granite State voted by a two-party margin of 5.72% more Democratic than the nation at-large – which is the most Democratic relative thereto New Hampshire has ever voted since the Republican Party was founded. Although Cox carried no counties, Hillsborough and longtime national bellwether Coös would prove his strongest counties in New England.

Results

Results by county

See also
 United States presidential elections in New Hampshire

References

New Hampshire
1920
1920 New Hampshire elections